June Knight (born Margaret Rose Valliquietto; January 22, 1913 – June 16, 1987) was an American theatre and film actress and singer.

Early years 
Knight was born in Los Angeles in 1913. Sickly throughout the first years of her life, she suffered from tuberculosis when she was 4 years old and doctors told her parents that there was a strong chance that she would not live to maturity. Due to infantile paralysis, she was unable to walk until she was five years old.

She started to perform songs and dance publicly at age ten.

Career 
Dancer John Holland changed her name to June Knight when she became his partner, assigning her the same name as that of his previous partner. That change led to a court case in 1940 when the actress June Knight filed suit against the original dancer with that name. The actress said that she had made the name famous and that the dancer had previously agreed to stop using that name.

At age 19, she appeared in the last Ziegfeld Follies show, Hot-Cha! (1932).  She was featured in four other Broadway shows, Take A Chance (1932), Jubilee (1935) (where she introduced the Cole Porter classic "Begin the Beguine"), The Would-Be Gentleman (1946) (her only non-musical) and Sweethearts (1947).

She also had a short-lived film career, appearing in 12 films from 1930 to 1940, most notably in Broadway Melody of 1936 (1935), in which she sang the hit song "I've Got a Feelin' You're Foolin'" with co-star Robert Taylor.

Personal life and death 
Knight married four times, first to Palm Beach stockbroker Paul Ames, with whom she lived nine days before he petitioned for a divorce. She then married Texas oilman Arthur A. Cameron. After their divorce she wed Lockheed Aircraft Corporation co-founder Carl B. Squier, whose wife had died in a plane crash 11 years earlier. Their union lasted 18 years. Following Squier's death, she married his Lockheed colleague and friend Jack Buehler.

Knight died in 1987, aged 74, due to complications from a stroke. She was interred in Pierce Brothers Valhalla Memorial Park.

In 1935, Knight was bound, gagged, and robbed of jewelry by two men who gained access to her 19th-story New York apartment by posing as  film executives. Police believed it was the work of the same men who similarly robbed actress Janice Dawson, that time posing as literary agents.

Recognition
For her contribution to the motion picture industry, Knight on 3 February 1960 received a star on the Hollywood Walk of Fame at 6247 Hollywood Boulevard.

Filmography

References

External links

 
 
 Photographs of June Knight
 
 June Knight(1935)

1913 births
1987 deaths
20th-century American actresses
Actresses from California
American film actresses
American musical theatre actresses
Burials at Valhalla Memorial Park Cemetery
People from Greater Los Angeles
20th-century American singers
20th-century American women singers